Diaphragmus is an extinct genus of brachiopod belonging to the order Productida and family Linoproductidae. Specimens have been found in Carboniferous beds in North America.

Species 
D. elegans Norwood and Pratten
D. nivosus Gordon 1975

References 

Paleozoic animals
Productida